Events during the year 1959 in Northern Ireland.

Incumbents
 Governor – 	The Lord Wakehurst 
 Prime Minister – Basil Brooke

Events
10 February – Unions vote to end the 15-year split in the Irish trade union movement.  The Irish Congress of Trade Unions results from the merger of the TUC and the CIU.
22 September – At its inaugural conference the Irish Congress of Trade Unions attacks the government of Northern Ireland for not recognising the new organisation.
Manufacture of Spot-On models (1:42 scale die-cast model cars) by Lines Bros at Castlereagh in Belfast begins.

Arts and literature
31 October – Ulster Television, the ITV franchise for Northern Ireland, goes on air.

Sport

Football
Irish League
Winners: Linfield

Irish Cup
Winners: Glenavon 1–1, 2–0 Ballymena United

Births

January to June
25 February – Stephen Moutray, Democratic Unionist Party MLA.
31 March – Ali McMordie, bass guitarist.
26 April – Alex Attwood, SDLP MLA.
12 May – Mark Robinson, Democratic Unionist Party MLA.
20 May – Gregory Gray, born Paul Lerwill, singer-songwriter (died 2019).

July to December
6 July – Danny Kennedy, Ulster Unionist Party MLA.
11 July – Stephen Warke, cricketer.
3 September – Dolores Kelly, SDLP MLA.
3 September – Dick Strawbridge, engineer and television presenter.
17 September – Charles Lawson, actor.
11 October – David Morgan, television presenter and journalist.
13 November
Trevor Ringland, Irish rugby international.
Davy Tweed, Irish rugby international, unionist councillor.
17 November – Kate Thompson, actress and romantic novelist.
18 November – Jimmy Quinn, footballer and football manager.
3 December – Eamonn Holmes, television and radio presenter.
9 December – Paul Jackson, cricketer.
15 December – Hugh Russell, boxer.

Full date unknown
Willie Doherty, installation and video artist.
John Farry, singer-songwriter.

Deaths
January – William Forbes Marshall, Presbyterian minister and poet (born 1888).
4 February – Una O'Connor, actress (born 1880).
16 May – Elisha Scott, footballer (born 1894).
13 June – Seán Lester, diplomat and last Secretary General of the League of Nations (born 1888).

See also
1959 in Scotland
1959 in Wales

References